The Asie Swan House is a historic house in Methuen, Massachusetts.  Built c. 1720, it is one of the oldest buildings in the city.  It is a -story frame house, five bays wide, with clapboard siding, central chimney, and granite foundation.  Its central entrance is flanked by sidelight windows.  The house originally stood at a location on Prospect Hill in what is now Lawrence, where it was used for the first town meetings beginning in 1726.  It was moved in 1808 to its present location.

The house was added to the National Register of Historic Places in 1984.

See also
 National Register of Historic Places listings in Methuen, Massachusetts
 National Register of Historic Places listings in Essex County, Massachusetts

References

Houses in Methuen, Massachusetts
Houses completed in 1720
National Register of Historic Places in Methuen, Massachusetts
Houses on the National Register of Historic Places in Essex County, Massachusetts
1720 establishments in Massachusetts